Aziznagar is a village in the Moinabad mandal, Ranga Reddy District, Telangana, India. It is approximately 6.8 km from the Mandal Main Town Moinabad. This village is considered as an urban village as it is very close to the city and is a highly developing area which has several universities/colleges like Vidya Jyothi Institute of Technology.

References

Villages in Ranga Reddy district